The 2006 Giro d'Italia began on 6 May in Seraing in Belgium, and stage 11 occurred on 18 May in Pontedera. As is usually the case in a Grand Tour, the first half of the race was considerably easier than the second half – both rest days occurred before the halfway point, and there were no mountain stages or stages ending with climbs among the first eleven.

The Giro began with an individual time trial, which defending champion Paolo Savoldelli won to become the first race leader. After breakaways and the team time trial in stage 5 (the first on Italian soil) resulted in three other riders wearing the pink jersey, Ivan Basso took a lead he held all the way to the Giro's conclusion in Milan with his victory in stage 8.

Sprinter Alessandro Petacchi, who had won thirteen stages in the last two editions of the Giro, fractured his kneecap in stage 3 and was forced to abandon the Giro and miss the rest of the season.

Stage 1
6 May 2006 — Seraing (Belgium)  (individual time trial)

The Giro began in Belgium with a short individual time trial. It was the first time the Giro had come to Belgium since 1973. The course included some climbing, with the second intermediate time check also awarding points to the mountains competition.

A number of early riders posted provisional best times on the day. The first to stand up for any sustained length of time was Stefan Schumacher's 8'03". That time held up against reigning world time trial champion Michael Rogers and other riders like José Rujano and Tom Danielson before José Enrique Gutiérrez bettered it by less than a second. Shortly afterward, Bradley McGee stopped the clock two seconds faster than Gutierrez. The only riders to follow McGee were the Giro's overall favorites and contenders. Danilo Di Luca had the best time at the first intermediate time check, but lost time as the ride wore on and finished in 8'09". Former teammates Damiano Cunego and Gilberto Simoni, though neither of them renowned as particularly good time trialists, both finished in 8'16", with Cunego milliseconds the better of the two. Ivan Basso turned in an 8'13" ride to place himself better than Simoni and Cunego in the first general classification.

With only defending Giro champion Paolo Savoldelli left to leave the starthouse, McGee's 8'01" was still best and it appeared that the Australian would get the first pink jersey. Savoldelli, however, set by far the best time at the intermediate time checks and was 11 seconds better than McGee at the finish, winning the stage and all four jerseys on the podiums afterward. Savoldelli was the only rider to finish the course in under eight minutes. McGee expressed disappointment after the stage that the last man had beaten him, but also recognized that Savoldelli had turned in the considerably better ride. For his part, Savoldelli was surprised by his victory, and felt poised to challenge for a third Giro victory.

Stage 1 result and general classification after stage 1

Stage 2
7 May 2006 — Mons (Belgium) to Charleroi Marcinelle (Belgium) 

The first road race stage was flat and raced on relatively straight roads, with a very wide final . It was a simple course expected to produce a mass sprint finish.

The arrival site of Marcinelle demonstrated why the Giro had come to Belgium – 2006 marked the 50th anniversary of a mining accident there that killed 262 people, including 136 Italians.

Intermittent rain fell throughout the day on all parts of the course. The maximum advantage attained by the four breakaway riders (Gabriele Missaglia, Beñat Albizuri, Mickaël Delage, and Arnaud Labbe) was 6'18", and they took the intermediate sprint and the climb on offer on the stage. With  to go, the time gap was reduced to three minutes. At this point, race leader Paolo Savoldelli's  team gave up the pacemaking, as the teams of the sprinters were more invested in making a timely catch of the leading group. Petacchi's last leadout man Alberto Ongarato did not maintain the pace that had been set before him in the race's final , leading to a chaotic sprint to the line. Olaf Pollack and Paolo Bettini also managed to out-sprint Petacchi, who was upset to finish just fourth. Savoldelli, celebrating his 33rd birthday, retained the race leadership.

Stage 3
8 May 2006 — Perwez (Belgium) to Namur (Belgium) 

Although the profile for this stage was quite flat, pre-race analysis expected that the stage would not favor sprinters like the previous stage had. The course included a cobbled climb by the Meuse River, on roads visited in La Flèche Wallonne, and another in the last  to the finish line by the Citadel of Namur.

It took two hours for a breakaway group to form on this stage. After a move instigated by Moisés Aldape, he and Amaël Moinard, Markel Irizar, Raffaele Illiano formed the day's escape. The peloton was content to let this group get away for a while, affording them three minutes advantage in the  after Aldape first attacked.  organized the chase, working for their captain, classics specialist Paolo Bettini, who was thought to be a favorite for the stage. Their lead started to dissipate as individual tactics began on the day's second climb. Aldape was first to the line and took sufficient points to gain the green jersey. Petacchi got up and, with the help of his teammates, made it to the finish some 14 minutes after the stage winner. Though he said he felt better after the stage than he did immediately after the crash, tests after the stage revealed that he had fractured his left kneecap and had to abandon the race.

The rain, which had been falling lightly throughout the day, intensified in the stage's final kilometers. Alberto Loddo was the first to try to attack for the stage win. José Luis Rubiera countered with 
 to go and appeared poised for the win until Stefan Schumacher passed him a few hundred meters later, winning the stage and the pink jersey.

Stage 4
9 May 2006 — Wanze (Belgium) to Hotton (Belgium) 

The last stage in Belgium was undulating, with several small rises in elevation. Included among them were two categorized climbs often included in the Ardennes classics.

The day's signature breakaway formed very quickly after the true beginning of the stage, which was expected given that the uphill stretches began almost immediately. Sandy Casar, Grischa Niermann, Patrick Calcagni, Jurgen Van de Walle, and Alessandro Bertolini slipped away and, thanks to a helpful tailwind, built up a 3'30" advantage by the  mark. Their eventual maximum advantage was just less than seven minutes.  and  led the chase. By  to go, the break's lead was reduced to 20 seconds, and Niermann tried to solo in the rest of the way. Eventually, the riders were all together again, though the escape had allowed Casar to be first over the day's climbs and win enough points to take the green jersey from Moisés Aldape.  led the peloton through the final kilometers – although they had lost their leader Alessandro Petacchi in the previous stage, they still had other strong sprinters on their squad, riders who would have normally been Petacchi's last leadout man. They set up the sprint with Mirco Lorenzetto in mind, but  leader Robbie McEwen followed their wheels and timed his acceleration just right to take his second stage win of this Giro. Aside from three riders, the entire peloton finished the stage together, meaning the day's effect on the overall standings was virtually nil – the only change was Bettini's second-place time bonus moving him from 11th to 10th.

Stage 5
11 May 2006 — Piacenza to Cremona  (team time trial)

After the rest day and transfer to Italy, the fifth stage was a team time trial (TTT). A favorite discipline of second-year race director Angelo Zomegnan, this was the first TTT in the Giro in 17 years.

The dominance of the Lance Armstrong-led Discovery Channel team in recent years in TTT's in the Tour de France had had that race institute a rule limiting time losses in the general classification for individual riders finishing together. The Giro did not institute this rule, however, and only real time was taken on the stage.

Though  was eight seconds off 's pace at the first time check and gradually faded further, they rode a very strong final  and put the next pink jersey on their star time trialist Serhiy Honchar.

's squad wasn't nearly as strong as it had been in the 2005 Tour de France when they were stage winners who handily defeated every team but , though they still managed third on the day with 37'25".  never stood much chance of retaining the jersey, though their sixth-place ride in 37'59" was better than pre-stage expectations.

Stage 6
12 May 2006 — Busseto to Forlì 

This stage was very flat, heading on straight roads southeast through the region of Emilia-Romagna. It was the first time the Giro had come to Forlì in 29 years, with a stage that stood to favor the sprinters.

Though the peloton first seemed to want to keep Sergiy Matveyev, Christophe Edaleine, and Andoni Aranaga from breaking away after just , the trio fought through the counter-attacks and became the day's signature escape. Their biggest advantage of the day was 6'14", at the intermediate sprint in Rio Saliceto.  led the chase, with double stage winner Robbie McEwen in mind. The peloton thus stood the risk of catching them too soon, which would leave open the possibility for counter-attacks when the catch occurred. The trio's lead grew a little for the next several kilometers until they were at last brought back with  left in the stage. Several teams tried to control the field in the run in to the finish, with their various sprinters in mind. 's Tomas Vaitkus flew out of the main field with  left, followed closely by McEwen and Olaf Pollack. Pollack later described that his primary leadout man André Korff had crashed about a kilometer earlier, which threw off his preparations for the sprint. Points classification leader McEwen was first over the line to claim his third stage win of the Giro, but the 12-second time bonus Pollack received made him the new race leader.

Stage 7
13 May 2006 — Cesena to Saltara

Stage 8
14 May 2006 — Civitanova Marche to Maielletta

Stage 9
15 May 2006 — Francavilla al Mare to Termoli

Stage 10
16 May 2006 — Termoli to Peschici

Stage 11
18 May 2006 — Pontedera  (individual time trial)

References

2006 Giro d'Italia
Giro d'Italia stages